Children of Love (French: Les enfants de l'amour) is a 1953 French drama film directed by Léonide Moguy and starring Etchika Choureau, Joëlle Bernard and Lise Bourdin.

Cast
 Etchika Choureau as Anne-Marie et Geneviève  
 Joëlle Bernard as Dolly  
 Lise Bourdin as Hélène Lambert 
 Jean-Claude Pascal as Doctor Baurain  
 Jean-Max as President Martichou 
 Maryse Martin as Madeleine  
 Dominique Page as Liliane  
 Jean-Pierre Jaubert as Roger Dubois  
 Mylène Demongeot as Nicole  
 Nadine Tallier as Lulu  
 Janine Darcey as A future mother  
 Marcelle Arnold as A woman who want to adopt a children
 Robert Vattier as Albert  
 Raymond Cordy as The policier  
 Paul Azaïs as M. Lefranc  
 Philippe Hersent as Inspector Gaultier  
 Georges Galley as Vittorio  
 Marcel Pérès as M. Landrieu  
 Héléna Manson as Mlle Lefort  
 Lucienne Bogaert as La Donnadieu  
 Germaine Dermoz as Nicole's mother
 Valentine Tessier as The director

References

Bibliography

External links 
 

1953 films
1953 drama films
French drama films
1950s French-language films
Films directed by Léonide Moguy
French black-and-white films
Films scored by Joseph Kosma
1950s French films